The Final Journey is a 2010 documentary that chronicles the largest of the Nazi concentration camps that were scattered throughout Germany during the Third Reich. Created and directed by the film maker R. J. Adams and narrated by Paul Kirby, the program focuses entirely on who played key roles and howin their contribution to the tragedy of the Holocaust.

Synopsis
The two-hour-long film utilizes a then and now format that blends first-generation archival film with current high definition footage of each of the former Nazi camps as they are today and the how they appeared during the Third Reich.

Historical sites
Several extermination camps are shown in the film: Dachau, Sachsenhausen, Buchenwald, Flossenbürg, Mauthausen, Ravensbrück, Stutthof and Bergen Belsen.

Filming
Production of The Final Journey began in 1998 and remains as a work in progress with part two, the Extermination camp, set for release in 2012. These sites known as Vernichtungslager functioned primarily as places of genocide as the answer for the Nazi question of the Jewish problem. Film crews for both part 1 and 2 of The Final Journey covered every aspect of each major camp located in Germany and the former occupied territories of the Third Reich.

See also
 Schutzstaffel
 Heinrich Himmler
 The Final Solution

References

External links
 
 

2010 films
2010 documentary films
American documentary films
Documentary films about the Holocaust
Films about Jews and Judaism
Documentary films about World War II
Films set in the 1930s
Films set in the 1940s
Films set in the 1990s
Films set in the 2000s
Films set in Germany
Films set in Kraków
Films shot in Poland
Films shot in Kraków
2010s English-language films
2010s American films